Sázava is a town in Benešov District in the Central Bohemian Region of the Czech Republic. It has about 3,700 inhabitants.

Administrative parts
Villages of Bělokozly, Černé Budy, Čeřenice and Dojetřice are administrative parts of Sázava.

Geography
It lies is a hilly landscape, the eastern part of the municipal territory belongs to the Benešov Uplands and the western part belongs to the Vlašim Uplands. Most of the built-up area is situated around bends of the Sázava River.

History
The settlement was founded around the Sázava Monastery, established in 1032 and destroyed in the Hussite Wars, in 1421. The first written mention of the village near the monastery called Černé Budy, which is the oldest part of the town, is from 1053. The municipal name of Sázava is modern.

Demographics

Economy
The eastern side of the town, on the left bank of the Sázava River, has a predominantly industrial character. It includes Kavalierglass, a glass manufacturer plant. It was established in 1837 by Franz Kavalier, however, the original smelter has not been preserved.

Transport
The town is located on the railway line from Prague to Ledeč nad Sázavou and is served by four train stations.

Sights
The main landmark is the Sázava Monastery. Today it is managed by the National Heritage Institute and open to the public. The monastery complex includes the Church of Saint Procopius.

In popular culture
Sázava has appeared under the name Sasau as one of the accessible towns in the 2018 video game Kingdom Come: Deliverance.

Notable people
Frank Toepfer (1845–1902), Czech-American machinist, engineer and businessman
Otomar Korbelář (1899–1976), actor
George Voskovec (1905–1981), Czech-American actor and writer

References

External links

Cities and towns in the Czech Republic
Populated places in Benešov District